This is the complete order of battle for the four major battles of the Waterloo campaign.

French Army order of battle

Headquarters

L'Armée du Nord under the command of Emperor Napoleon I.
Major Général (Chief of Staff): Marshal Soult, Duke of Dalmatia.
Commander of artillery: General of Division Charles-Étienne-François Ruty.
Field commanders under the direct command of Emperor Napoleon:
 Marshal Ney, Prince of the Moskova:
 On 16 June 1815, at the battle of Quatre Bras, in command of the Left Wing: I Corps, II Corps (minus the Girard division, present at the battle of Ligny), III Cavalry Corps (minus the l'Héritier division, present at the battle of Ligny) and Imperial Guard light cavalry division.
 On 18 June 1815, at the battle of Waterloo, effective field commander of all the French forces present, minus those engaged at Plancenoit (VI Corps and elements of the Guard).
 Marshal Marquis de Grouchy:
 On 16 June 1815, at the Battle of Ligny, in command of the French Cavalry Reserve: I Cavalry Corps, II Cavalry Corps, the l'Héritier division (detached from III Cavalry Corps) and IV Cavalry Corps.
 Between 17 and 19 June 1815, in command of the Right Wing: III Corps (minus the Domon's cavalry division, present at the battle of Waterloo), IV Corps, I Cavalry Corps (minus the division of Subervie present at the battle of Waterloo, but with the Teste infantry division attached to it), II Cavalry Corps.

I Corps

II Corps

III Corps

IV Corps

VI Corps

I Cavalry Reserve Corps

II Cavalry Reserve Corps

III Cavalry Reserve Corps

IV Cavalry Reserve Corps

French Imperial Guard 
 Commander of the Garde Impériale: Marshal Édouard Adolphe Casimir Joseph Mortier (on sick leave, following a sudden attack of sciatica).
 Aide-major général (2nd in command): General of Division Comte Antoine Drouot.
 Sous-aide-major général: Colonel Hériot.

Anglo-allied Army order of battle

Combined British, Dutch and Hanoverian forces were under the supreme command of Field Marshal Arthur Wellesley, 1st Duke of Wellington. The order of battle included below reflects all units of the Anglo-allied Army including those that were not present for the battles themselves (units spread across the area or on garrison duty). The casualty numbers include all the casualties suffered by each regiment over the three days of fighting during the campaign from 16 June 1815 to dawn on 19 June 1815.

Present at the Battle of Waterloo, Wellington had 71,257 soldiers available, 3,866 officers and 65,919 other ranks. By the end of the day's fighting the army had suffered 16,084 casualties (3,024 killed, 10,222 wounded and 2,838 missing) a loss of 24.6%.

Headquarters and support regiments

I Corps
I Corps fielded 24,844 (1,233 officers and 23,383 other ranks) on 18 June 1815 taking into account those not present in the Order of Battle and the casualties on the previous two days.

II Corps
With so much of the Dutch Belgian contingent not present at the battle, only 579 officers and 8,677 men (9,256 in total) were fielded by II Corps.

Cavalry Corps
With only three regiments not present at the battle the Cavalry Corps was the most complete at Waterloo fielding 16,133 (933 officers and 13,897 men) after taking into account the small losses at Quatre-Bras and during the retreat on 17 June 1815.

Reserves
The reserves, 34,394 men and 56 guns, came under the direct command of Wellington during the Battle of Waterloo. The British 7th Infantry Division under Major General Kenneth MacKenzie was not present at the battle as the brigade manned various garrisons around the area. The Hanoverian Reserve Division was also not present, again manning garrisons on behalf of the army. Actual combatants from the Reserve present at the battle numbered 18,964 with 56 guns.

Prussian Army order of battle
The Prussian Army was led by Field Marshal Gebhard Leberecht von Blücher, Prince of Wahlstadt and his chief of staff August von Gneisenau and remained independent from the allied Anglo-Dutch-German army during the course of the campaign.

Staff
Major General Karl von Grolman, was Quartermaster General.

I Corps

II Corps

III Corps

IV Corps

See also
 Ligny order of battle
 Quatre Bras order of battle
 Military mobilisation during the Hundred Days

Notes

References

Bibliography 
 
 
 
 
 
 Houssaye, Henry (1899), 1815 (27th ed.), Paris: Perrin & C.: Volume 1 and Volume 2.
  (facsimile printed by The Naval & Military Press Ltd, East Sussex, England)
 
 
 
 
 
 Siborne, William (1844), History of the War in France and Belgium, in 1815 (2nd ed.), London: T. & W. Boone: Volume 1 and Volume 2 (4th and 5th editions published as The Waterloo campaign, 1815). This edition shows "Appendix" in uncut version; (1848): 3rd edition published in one book.
  (1st, 2nd and 3rd editions published as History of the war in France and Belgium in 1815).

Further reading
  — Short biographies on all ranks present down to Lieutenant-General, with a few more junior ranks, however the list of regiments includes footnotes on junior officers who went on to have notable careers.
  — Order of battle for the three armies with names and numbers.
  — List of staff officers.

Waterloo
Waterloo campaign